Captain Marcus Rainsford (c. 1758 – 4 November 1817) was an officer in the British Army, serving in the Battle of Camden in 1780, during the American Revolutionary War. He published An Historical Account of the Black Empire of Hayti, London, in 1805.

Biography 
Rainsford was a younger son of Edward Rainsford of Sallins, Kildare, born c. 1750. He was educated at Trinity College Dublin and obtained an MA in 1773. He joined the Irish Volunteers (18th century) in 1779.

He obtained a commission and saw service in the 105th regiment, commanded by Francis, lord Rawdon (afterwards second) Earl of Moira, during the American War of Independence. He took part in Siege of Charleston and the Battle of Camden in 1780. He then went to Jamaica with the Duke of Cumberland's Regiment.

In 1794 he served under the Duke of York in the Netherlands, during the Flanders Campaign and was afterwards employed in raising black troops in the West Indies.

In 1799 Rainsford visited St. Domingo, and had an interview with Toussaint L'Ouverture. He was subsequently arrested and condemned to death as a spy, but was reprieved and eventually set at liberty.

Rainsford died in November 1817 and is buried in St Giles in the Fields, London, England.

Works
 Rainsford.A Memoir of Transactions that took place in St. Domingo in the Spring of 1799 (London, 1802; 2nd edit. as St. Domingo; or an Historical, Political, and Military Sketch of the Black Republic, 1802).
 Rainsford. An Historical Account of the Black Empire of Hayti, London, 1805
 Rainsford. A poem in heroic couplets, The Revolution; or Britain Delivered, London, 1801 (2nd edit.).

References 

1750s births
1817 deaths

Year of birth uncertain
People from County Kildare
British Army personnel of the American Revolutionary War
Haitian Revolution
British Army personnel of the French Revolutionary Wars
Alumni of Trinity College Dublin
British Army officers